Levi Meaden (born ) is a Canadian actor.

Life and career
Meaden was born in Saskatoon, Saskatchewan, and raised in Calgary, Alberta. He made his screen debut in 2009, appearing in the sixteen-minute crime-drama film short Brotherly Love, which Marcus Schwenzel wrote and directed. Three years later, he made his full-length feature debut in writer-director David DeCoteau's horror film 1313: Bigfoot Island, part of the 1313 horror-thriller video series. Levi then appeared in the first season of The CW's fantasy drama series The Secret Circle in 2011.

In 2014, Levi appeared in three television series, including Almost Human on Fox, the series premiere of The 100 on The CW, and the final season of The Killing. In 2015, he appeared in the fantasy series Olympus and the crime dramedy iZombie. The following year, he appeared in the superhero action-adventure drama Legends of Tomorrow (2016). Levi also appeared as Matt Copeland, the eldest child in the Copeland family, in all 13 episodes of Syfy's apocalyptic survival series Aftermath.

In 2017, Levi returned to film screens, including appearing in the 20th Century Fox blockbuster War for the Planet of the Apes, followed by writer-director Kurtis David Harder's sci-fi thriller Incontrol. He followed this with his leading-role debut in the drama-thriller Alice in the Attic, written and directed by Jordan Anthony Greer. Levi began 2018 with an appearance in the high-budget sci-fi action epic Pacific Rim Uprising and also appeared in Breaking In.

Filmography

References

External links
 
 

1987 births
Canadian male film actors
Canadian male television actors
Living people
Male actors from Saskatoon